Saint Barnabas was an early Christian mentioned in the New Testament. 

Barnabas may also refer to:

Barnabas (name), a masculine given name or a surname, including a list of people and fictional characters with the name
Barnabás, a Hungarian masculine given name
Barnabas (band), a Christian rock band
Epistle of Barnabas, of the New Testament apocrypha
Gospel of Barnabas, of the New Testament apocrypha
Acts of Barnabas, of the New Testament apocrypha

See also
Saint Barnabas (disambiguation)
Barnabus (disambiguation)
Barnaba (disambiguation)
Barnaby (disambiguation)
Barnabas Fund, an international Christian aid agency 
House of St Barnabas, a historic building and charity in London, England
Varnavas (Greek: Βαρνάβας 'Barnabas'), a town in Greece